Anthony R. Brown (December 3, 1968) is a former Republican member of the Kansas House of Representatives, representing the 38th district from 2005 until 2013. Brown, who has a BSE in Secondary Social Sciences from Emporia State University, has worked as a carpenter and school teacher. He is a member of the Knights of Columbus and Holy Family Catholic Church. In 2012, he ran for the 3rd district of the Kansas Senate, but lost to incumbent Democrat Tom Holland.

Issue positions
Brown's website lists immigration, education, eminent domain, pro-life, environmental, and child support as his main legislative focuses.

Committee membership
 Financial Institutions (Chair)
 Taxation
 Federal and State Affairs
 Insurance

Sponsored legislation
 H 2150 – Property taxation; 2% limit on valuation increases. February 27, 2009
 H 2202 – Enforcement of laws concerning unlawful immigration. February 3, 2009
 H 2205 – Repeal of K.S.A. 76-731a, which grants residency for tuition purposes to certain unlawful immigrants. February 3, 2009
 H 2206 – Amendments to late term and partial birth abortion law. March 5, 2009

Major donors
The top five donors to Brown's 2008 campaign:
1. Prairie Band Potawatomi Nation – $1,000
2. Kansas Bankers Assoc. – $1,000
3. Koch Industries – $1,000
4. Farmers Insurance Group – $1,000
5. Hodgdon, Mary Jane – $1,000

References

External links
 Official website
 Kansas Legislature - Anthony Brown
 Project Vote Smart profile
 Kansas Votes profile
 State Surge - Legislative and voting track record
 Follow the Money campaign contributions:
 2004, 2006, 2008

Republican Party members of the Kansas House of Representatives
Living people
21st-century American politicians
1968 births
Emporia State University alumni